"Choosey Beggar" was a 1965 song recorded by Motown R&B group The Miracles on its Tamla label subsidiary. It was issued as the B-side of the group's top-20 million-selling single, "Going to a Go-Go", and was taken from the group's Billboard Top 10 Pop album of the same name.

Written by Miracles members Smokey Robinson and Pete Moore and produced by Robinson, this song also became a national hit, reaching number 35 on the Billboard R&B chart. As the song's narrator, lead singer Smokey Robinson, using a play on the old axiom, "Beggars can't be choosers", portrays a man who simply refuses to accept just "any girl":

Beggars can't be choicey, I know...that's what the people say...But though my heart is begging for love ...I've turned some love away..." Only one girl is right for him... "I'm a choosey beggar...and you're my choice..."

Cash Box described it as a "a slow-shufflin’ lament about a decidedly one-man woman."

"Choosey Beggar" has inspired  cover versions by Debby Boone, and  Jazz artist Chazz Dixon, and has been included in the Miracles' compilation album Greatest Hits - Vol. 2, along with several other Miracles "Greatest Hits" compilations.

Personnel Credits

Personnel – The Miracles
Smokey Robinson – lead vocals, co-writer, producer
Claudette Rogers Robinson – background vocals
Pete Moore – background vocals, co-writer 
Ronnie White – background vocals
Bobby Rogers – background vocals
Marv Tarplin – guitar

Other personnel
Other instrumentation by The Funk Brothers and the Detroit Symphony Orchestra

References

External links
The Miracles-"Choosey Beggar", YouTube video

1965 songs
The Miracles songs
Songs written by Warren "Pete" Moore
Songs written by Smokey Robinson
Song recordings produced by Smokey Robinson